Stratton House may refer to:

In the United Kingdom
Stratton Park, a country house at East Stratton, Hampshire

In the United States
Smith-Joseph-Stratton House, Montgomery, Alabama, listed on the National Register of Historic Places in Montgomery County, Alabama
Stratton House (Centerville, Iowa), listed on the National Register of Historic Places in Appanoose County, Iowa
Stratton (Centreville, Maryland)
Edward B. Stratton House, Newton, Massachusetts
Bullen-Stratton-Cozzen House, Sherborn, Massachusetts
William B. and Mary Chase Stratton House, Grosse Pointe Park, Michigan, listed on the National Register of Historic Places in Wayne County, Michigan
Gov. Charles C. Stratton House, Woolwich Township, New Jersey, listed on the National Register of Historic Places in Gloucester County, New Jersey
Walter Stratton House, Roxbury, New York
Patterson–Stratton House, Eugene, Oregon, listed on the National Register of Historic Places in Lane County, Oregon
Stratton–Cornelius House, Portland, Oregon
C.C. Stratton House, Salem, Oregon, listed on the National Register of Historic Places in Marion County, Oregon